Christoph Hoehenleitner (born August 10, 1983) is a German professional ice hockey player currently under contract with the Hannover Scorpions of the Oberliga. He previously played 12 seasons for the Grizzlys Wolfsburg in the Deutsche Eishockey Liga (DEL).

References

External links

1983 births
Living people
German ice hockey left wingers
Hannover Scorpions players
ERC Ingolstadt players
EHC München players
Grizzlys Wolfsburg players